The Scar is a 1976 Polish film written and directed by Krzysztof Kieślowski and starring Franciszek Pieczka. Filmed on location in Olechów, Poland, the film is about a man put in charge of the construction of a large chemical factory in his home town in the face of strong opposition from the townspeople who are concerned with their short-term needs. The film received the Polish Film Festival Special Jury Prize (Krzysztof Kieslowski) and Best Actor Award (Franciszek Pieczka) in 1976. The Scar was Krzysztof Kieślowski's second feature film but the first to be released directly into theaters.

Plot
After discussions and dishonest negotiations, a decision is made as to where a large new chemical factory is to be built. Stefan Bednarz (Franciszek Pieczka), an honest Party man, is put in charge of the construction. Bednarz used to live in the small town where the factory is to be built, and his wife used to be a Party activist there. Although he has unpleasant memories of the town, Bednarz sets out to build a place where people will be able to live well and work well. His intentions and convictions, however, conflict with those of the townspeople who are mainly concerned with their short-term needs. Disillusioned, Bednarz gives up his position.

Cast
 Franciszek Pieczka as Stefan Bednarz
 Mariusz Dmochowski as Vorsitzender
 Jerzy Stuhr as Bednarz's assistant
 Jan Skotnicki
 Stanislaw Igar as Minister
 Stanislaw Michalski
 Michal Tarkowski as TV editor
 Andrzej Skupien
 Halina Winiarska as Bednarz's Wife
 Joanna Orzeszkowska as Eva (Bednarz's Daughter)
 Jadwiga Bryniarska
 Agnieszka Holland as Secretary
 Malgorzata Lesniewska
 Asja Lamtiugina 
 Ryszard Bacciarelli
 F. Barfuss
 Bohdan Ejmont
 Henryk Hunko
 Jan Jeruzal
 Zbigniew Lesien
 Konrad Morawski
 Jerzy Prazmowski
 Jan Stawarz
 Wojciech Stockinger
 Kazimierz Sulkowski

Production
Filming locations
 Olechów, Lódz, Lódzkie, Poland

Reception
Awards and nominations
 1976 Polish Film Festival Special Jury Prize (Krzysztof Kieslowski) 
 1976 Polish Film Festival Award for Best Actor (Franciszek Pieczka)

References

External links
 
 
 Review of The Scar

1976 films
Films directed by Krzysztof Kieślowski
1976 drama films
Films with screenplays by Krzysztof Kieślowski
Polish drama films
1970s Polish-language films